This is a list of grindcore bands, including bands that perform grindcore fusion genres.

List

A
 Aborted
 ACxDC
 Agathocles
 Agoraphobic Nosebleed
 Anal Cunt
 Antigama
 Asesino
 Assück
 Autopsy

B
 The Berzerker
 Blood Duster
 Bolt Thrower
 Brain Drill
 Brodequin
 Brujeria
 Brutal Truth

C
 Caninus
 Carcass
 Cattle Decapitation
 Cephalic Carnage
 Circle of Dead Children
 Cock and Ball Torture
 The County Medical Examiners

D
 Damaged
 Dance Club Massacre
 Daughters
 Dead Infection
 Defecation
 Devourment
 The Dillinger Escape Plan
 Discordance Axis
 Dying Fetus

E
 Ed Gein 
 Electro Hippies
 Exhumed
 Extreme Noise Terror
 Extreme Smoke

F
 Fantômas
 Fuck the Facts

G
 General Surgery
 Genghis Tron
 Godflesh
 Gore Beyond Necropsy
 Gridlink
 Gut

H
 Haemorrhage
 Hatebeak
 Head of David
 Head Wound City
 Hellnation
 Holocausto Canibal
 Human Remains

I
 Impaled
 Impetigo
 In Strict Confidence

L
 Last Days of Humanity
 Liberteer
 Lock Up
 The Locust

M
 Macabre
 Meathook Seed
 Misery Index
 Mortician
 Mortification

N
 Nails
 Naked City
 Napalm Death
 Nasum
 The Number Twelve Looks Like You

O
 Old Lady Drivers

P
 Painkiller
 Phantomsmasher
 Phobia
 Pig Destroyer

R
 The Red Chord
 Regurgitate
 Repulsion
 Rotten Sound

S
 See You Next Tuesday
 Sore Throat
 Success Will Write Apocalypse Across the Sky

T
 Terrorizer
 The Tony Danza Tapdance Extravaganza
 Totem Skin
 Trap Them

U
 Unholy Grave

W
 War from a Harlots Mouth
 Wormrot

X
 Xysma

See also
 List of crust punk bands
 List of hardcore punk bands
 List of crossover thrash bands
 List of death metal bands
 List of heavy metal bands
 List of mathcore bands
 List of deathcore bands

References

Lists of grindcore bands